Hymenostephium is a genus of flowering plants in the family Asteraceae.  It includes herbs and slender shrubs that occur from Mexico through Central America and into South America.

Hymenostephium is characterized by the relatively slender habit of the plants, 1-2 seriate involucres, and relatively small heads of flowers.  There is variation in the pappus which, in part, has led to some members having been placed formerly in the now empty genus Haplocalymma, or in separate genera now considered as synonymous with Hymenostephium.  Molecular phylogenetic data  place the genus as sister to Sclerocarpus and in a relatively basal position in the subtribe Helianthinae, the group that includes the common sunflower (Helianthus annuus).

 Species
 Hymenostephium anomalum (S.F.Blake) E.E.Schill. & Panero - Colombia
 Hymenostephium brandegeei (S.F.Blake) E.E.Schill. & Panero - Mexico (Baja California)
 Hymenostephium cordatum (Hook. & Arn.) S.F.Blake - Mexico to northern Colombia
 Hymenostephium debile (Cabrera) Cabrera - Argentina (Jujuy , Salta ), Bolivia (Santa Cruz)
 Hymenostephium gracillimum (Brandegee) E.E.Schill. & Panero - Mexico (Oaxaca, Chiapas)
 Hymenostephium hintonii (H.Rob.) E.E.Schill. & Panero - Mexico (Guerrero, Michoacán)
 Hymenostephium kingii (McVaugh) E.E.Schill. & Panero - Mexico (Nayarit, Jalisco)
 Hymenostephium lepidostephanum (Cuatrec.) E.E.Schill. & Panero - Peru
 Hymenostephium meridense S.F.Blake - Venezuela
 Hymenostephium molinae (H.Rob.) E.E.Schill. & Panero - Nicaragua
 Hymenostephium mucronatum (S.F.Blake) E.E.Schill. & Panero -  Colombia, Venezuela
 Hymenostephium quitensis (Benth.) E.E.Schill. & Panero - Colombia to Venezuela (Táchira) and Ecuador
 Hymenostephium rivularis (Poepp.) E.E.Schill. & Panero - Central America to western Bolivia
 Hymenostephium rudbeckioides  S.F.Blake -   Ecuador to Peru
 Hymenostephium serratum (Rusby) E.E.Schill. & Panero -  Colombia, Venezuela
 Hymenostephium strigosum (Klatt) E.E.Schill. & Panero - Costa Rica
 Hymenostephium superaxillare S.F.Blake - Mexico (Chihuahua, Durango)
 Hymenostephium tenue (A.Gray) E.E.Schill. & Panero - Mexico (Oaxaca, Chiapas, Guerrero, Michoacán, Puebla, México State , Jalisco, Nayarit)
 Hymenostephium uniseriatum E.E.Schill. & Panero - Mexico (Morelos , Guerrero, Michoacán, Puebla, México State)
 Hymenostephium viride Steyerm. - Venezuela
 Hymenostephium websteri (B.L.Turner) E.E.Schill. & Panero - Mexico (Jalisco, Nayarit)
 Hymenostephium woronowii (S.F.Blake) E.E.Schill. & Panero - Mexico (Michoacán)

References

Asteraceae genera
Heliantheae